Kensington is a town in Rockingham County, New Hampshire, United States. The population was 2,095 at the 2020 census.

History
Once a parish of Hampton, Kensington was incorporated in 1737 by New Hampshire governor Jonathan Belcher. Of the 27 towns granted by Governor Belcher, only three were given names, one of which was Kensington, named for Baron Kensington, owner of Kensington Palace in London.

Geography
The majority of Kensington lies within the Piscataqua River watershed, via the Exeter River. The southeast portion of town drains to Hampton Harbor via the Taylor and Hampton Falls rivers, and the southwest corner of the town drains to the Merrimack River.

Adjacent municipalities
 Exeter, New Hampshire (north)
 Hampton Falls, New Hampshire (east)
 Seabrook, New Hampshire (southeast)
 South Hampton, New Hampshire (south)
 East Kingston, New Hampshire (west)

Demographics

As of the census of 2000, there were 1,893 people, 657 households, and 532 families residing in the town.  The population density was 158.4 people per square mile (61.2/km2).  There were 672 housing units at an average density of 56.2 per square mile (21.7/km2).  The racial makeup of the town was 98.31% White, 0.11% African American, 0.21% Native American, 0.63% Asian, and 0.74% from two or more races.

There were 657 households, out of which 40.3% had children under the age of 18 living with them, 72.9% were married couples living together, 5.8% had a female householder with no husband present, and 18.9% were non-families. 13.4% of all households were made up of individuals, and 4.9% had someone living alone who was 65 years of age or older.  The average household size was 2.88 and the average family size was 3.18.

In the town, the population was spread out, with 27.8% under the age of 18, 5.0% from 18 to 24, 32.0% from 25 to 44, 25.4% from 45 to 64, and 9.8% who were 65 years of age or older.  The median age was 39 years. For every 100 females, there were 97.6 males.  For every 100 females age 18 and over, there were 100.0 males.

The median income for a household in the town was $67,344, and the median income for a family was $72,679. Males had a median income of $56,023 versus $35,278 for females. The per capita income for the town was $29,265.  About 3.4% of families and 4.6% of the population were below the poverty line, including 5.1% of those under age 18 and 4.6% of those age 65 or over.

Notable people 

 Dan Dailey (born 1947), glass artist
 Hideaki Miyamura (born 1955), studio potter

Sites of interest 

The town has four buildings, each on Amesbury Road (New Hampshire Route 150), listed on the National Register of Historic Places:
 Kensington Social Library
 Kensington Town House
 North School, also known locally as the Brick School
 Union Meetinghouse-Universalist Church

References

External links
 
 New Hampshire Economic and Labor Market Information Bureau Profile

 
Towns in Rockingham County, New Hampshire
Populated places established in 1737
1737 establishments in New Hampshire
Towns in New Hampshire